Lettermullen, ( or possibly "the hill with the mill"), is a small island and village on the coast of southern Connemara in County Galway, Ireland. Lettermullen is in the parish of Kilcummin, barony of Moycullen, and province of Connaught. It forms one side of Kiegall Bay, and its northern end is part of the shore of Casheen Bay. The inhabitants are chiefly employed in herring and cod fisheries and in the collection of seaweed for manure.

Lettermullen is part of the Gaeltacht (Irish-speaking region of Ireland) and Irish is the most common spoken language. Accordingly, its official name is Leitir Mealláin.

Lettermullen is connected to the islands of Dinish, Furnish, Inisherk and An Crappagh.

A very well preserved Signal Station is situated near Golam Head. These stations were built all along the Irish coast by the British from 1804 to 1806 to monitor for maritime invasions.

A picturesque cemetery is situated just south of R374 immediately after you cross the bridge from Gorumna to Lettermullen.

Geology

The northern third of Lettermullan is composed of the same intrusive Devonian-aged granite underlying most of Galway that formed from crustal melting as a result of the Caledonian Orogeny in the late Silurian. The remainder of the island is made up of Ordovician-aged bedrock of sedimentary marine rocks and basalt.

Demographics

Famous people born on Lettermullen 

 Antoine Ó Flatharta  (playwright and scriptwriter)

References

 http://www.udaras.ie/en/faoin-udaras/foilseachain/tuarascalacha-bliantula-agus-raitis#2012 Annual Reports and Statements - Údarás Gaeltacht
 https://web.archive.org/web/20131203012132/http://www.heritagecouncil.ie/fileadmin/user_upload/Publications/Education/The_Irish_Headhunter_catalogue.pdf

Islands of County Galway
Gaeltacht towns and villages
Gaeltacht places in County Galway